Yujiulü Yucheng (pinyin: Yùjiǔlǘ Yúchéng) (?–485) was ruler of the Rouran (464–485) with the title of Shouluobuzhen Khagan (受羅部真可汗). He was the first Rouran ruler to adopt Chinese style era name, which was Yongkang (永康 Yǒngkāng 464–484). He was the elder son of Yujiulü Tuhezhen.

Reign 
He sought peaceful relations with Chinese states at first. He sent a tribute to Liu Song in 468 in 471. Another tribute composed of Kumo Xi and Khitan slaves were sent to Northern Wei in February and July 469. He continued his father's campaign against Tarim Base states following year. During a campaign against Khotan in 470, the Khotanese king wrote in his supplicatory letter to the Emperor Xianwen that all of the statelets in the west had submitted to the Rouran, asking for assistance. This brought Rouran against Northern Wei.

In February 472 and 473, Yucheng attacked Northern Wei across the western border, targeting Dunhuang. He tried to reconcile with Wei by asking a hand of a princess in 475. However, Wei court refused it, citing frequent raids of Rouran into their territory. Yucheng continued his tributes to Northern Wei in 476 and 477.

However in 478, Yucheng used the opportunity of fall of Liu Song to attack Wei. He met with Wang Hongfan (王洪范), the envoy of Xiao Daocheng, made a common pact and sent 300,000 troops to attack the Northern Wei. He made another alliance in 473, this time with Jangsu of Goguryeo with a view to keeping Northern Wei under control. Allied Rouran-Korean armies crushed Didouyu Khitans later in 479.

He attacked Northern Wei again in December 485, Emperor Xiaowen's cousin Yuan Cheng (元澄) the Prince of Rencheng was sent in front of Chinese forces to resist. By the time of his death in same year later, Yucheng had restored the Kaghanate to a status even more powerful than the times of Datan. He was succeeded by his son Yujiulü Doulun.

References

Sources 

History of the Northern Dynasties, vol. 86.
Book of Wei, vol 103.

 

Khagans of the Rouran